Chatelaine is an English-language Canadian women's magazine which covers topics from food, style and home décor to politics, health and relationships. Chatelaine and its French-language version, Châtelaine, are published by St. Joseph Communications.

Chatelaine was first published in March 1928 by Maclean Publishing. From 1957 to 1977, Chatelaines editor was Doris Anderson, under whose tenure the magazine covered women's issues, including the rise of feminism as a social phenomenon. Other recent editors include Mildred Istona, Rona Maynard and Lianne George. The current editor is Maureen Halushak.

In 2014, Chatelaine ranked first in Canada as the largest magazine with a total circulation of 534,294 copies. Chatelaine is now the fourth largest magazine in Canada with a circulation of 257,000 according to AAM June 2017. Due to falling print ad revenues and a declining circulation, Chatelaine reduced its publication frequency from 12 to 6 times a year in 2017. Other Rogers Media publications, which held an interest in Chatelaine at the time, also reduced their publication frequency or became digital-only publications.

Founding
First published in March 1928, Chatelaine was created by the Maclean Hunter Publishing Company as a means to reach a different demographic than its other publications, Maclean's and the Financial Post. Maclean Hunter Publishing Company solicited ideas from Canadian women to choose a name for the magazine, offering a $1000 prize for the winning entry.  The contest drew 75,000 entries.  A rancher's wife from Eburne, British Columbia won with her suggestion of "The Chatelaine." The title refers to the ring of keys which housewives long ago would use to get into every part of the house.

1920s and 1930s

The first issue of Chatelaine was published the same month that Emily Murphy presented the Persons Case to the Supreme Court, a major turning point in Canadian women's history. In December 1929, Murphy wrote an article for Chatelaine entitled "Now That Women Are Persons, What's Ahead?" Along with providing advice on style, cooking, homemaking, and child-rearing, Chatelaine published editorials from influential female thinkers. In 1928 and 1929, article topics included panic over the rising divorce rate, "Wages and Wives" (April 1929), and the high maternal mortality rate in rural Canada (July 1928).

The economic hardships of the Great Depression changed the tone of Chatelaine. During the 1930s, the magazine became less political. Popular parts of the magazine included monthly budget meal plans and romantic fiction. There was a rise in male-authored articles, including "Men Don't Want Clever Wives," and "What Did Your Husband Give Up For Marriage?"(August 1938).

The magazine encouraged participation from readers, offering a prize of $25 to the best letter written in response to one of their articles. In October 1938, Edith Hunter of Calgary won the $25 for her letter in response to "What Did Your Husband Give Up For Marriage?" contesting the article.  Chatelaine tried to maintain its position as a voice for Canadian women, and included a few political articles with a feminist edge such as "When Women Enter Public Life?" (September 1938), and "Why I Had a Civil Marriage" (March 1935).

World War II

The editor of the magazine from 1929 to 1952 was Byrne Hope Sanders. Sanders took some time off from the magazine during World War II after being seconded to Ottawa. She was made a Companion of the Order of Canada for her work as head of the Wartime Prices and Trade Board, where she implemented food rationing and set up a consumer council of women.

During the Second World War, Chatelaine published cover images of young women in uniform, working on farms, and contributing to the war effort. After the war, as husbands returned home from overseas, the magazine immediately switched to images of ultra-femininity and articles on being a wife. There was a sharp increase in articles about motherhood and family life.  Editorials such as "Don't Delay Parenthood" (May 1946) were suitable companions to the "Baby Boom" period.

1957–1977

After five years under editor John Clare (editor 1952–1957), feminist Doris Anderson took over the position as first female editor in chief of Chatelaine in 1957 and held the position until 1977. Under Anderson, Chatelaine began publishing controversial content about subjects including sex and women's rights.

Her early tenure at the magazine saw it transformed from a traditional women's publication into one that addressed challenging issues, including legal abortion in specific circumstances (1959), an exposé on child abuse (1960), a critique of Canadian divorce laws (1961) and a call for equal pay for women (1962). The writers she employed included June Callwood, Barbara Frum, Adrienne Clarkson, and Michele Landsberg.

In 1963, Anderson considered publishing an excerpt of Betty Friedan's The Feminine Mystique. Anderson turned down the excerpt, claiming that the magazine had already covered the material Friedan wrote about. This anecdote is often used to distinguish Anderson and her publication as ahead of its time. Anderson later said that she regretted missing out on what she called "the scoop of the century."

Anderson pursued and was passed over for the position of editor in chief of Maclean's magazine three times in just over two years: first for Peter Gzowski, then for former managing editor Phil Sykes and finally for Peter C. Newman. It would not be until 2016, more than 45 years later, that a female editor would be appointed to helm Maclean's, the country's oldest active magazine (launched in 1905).

Promoting the role of women in politics under her direction, Chatelaine identified 50 women who had potential as parliamentarians and put 12 of them – including Member of Parliament Flora MacDonald who referred to it in an interview at Anderson's passing[4] – on the cover. For much of her life, she supported greater representation of women in Parliament. In 1974, she was made an Officer of the Order of Canada for her contributions to publishing and to public affairs. She left the magazine in 1977.

1977–2004

Mildred Istona was editor in chief from 1977 until 1994. Rona Maynard was editor in chief from 1994 until 2004. Under Maynard, the magazine became more personal, often dealing with the struggles, stories and needs of everyday women. Lee Simpson was the first female publisher of Chatelaine in 1988. Donna Clark was Publisher from 1998 until 2004. Clark led a re-launch of Chatelaine that cost more than $2 million in March 1999.

2004–2008
Kim Pittaway succeeded Maynard in 2004 as Chatelaine's editor in chief. Maynard chose Pittaway to replace her with help from publisher Donna Clark. Pittaway joined Chatelaine in 1997 as a freelance editor, and in 1999 started writing her monthly column "Broadside". In 2001, she joined the magazine full-time as managing editor. Pittaway departed the magazine after 15 months as editor in chief due to conflicts with the Publisher. Kerry Mitchell was publisher of Chatelaine at that time. Mitchell was publisher of Chatelaine and vice-president of Rogers Consumer Publishing from 2004 until 2009.

Beth Hitchcock was named interim editor of Chatelaine for 5 months in 2005–2006.

Sara Angel spent 14 months in the position of editor in chief of Chatelaine from May 2006 – July 2007. Angel looked to infuse "more opinion, more entertainment and more ideas" into Chatelaine to bring back previous editor Doris Anderson's feminist voice.  The publication had 4.5 million readers at the time, according to the Print Measurement Bureau.

Maryam Sanati was named editor in chief of Chatelaine February 2008. Sanati had been deputy editor of Chatelaine for more than 18 months. Her role as editor in chief was announced on the eve of the media brand's 80th anniversary celebration. The magazine unveiled a new look with its May 2018 issue.

In 2008, the magazine would be recognized as the second-most influential magazine in Canada – just ahead of Maclean's.

2009–2014
Ken Whyte assumed the role of publisher of Chatelaine October 2009 until 2011 when he was named President of Rogers Publishing.

Jane Francisco was named editor in chief November 2009, making her the magazine's fifth editor in less than six years. Between 2004 and 2010, Chatelaine had lost nearly 850,000 readers from total yearly readership. Under Francisco's tenure, Chatelaine celebrated its 85 anniversary in 2013 with a special June double issue with four flip covers.

Tara Tucker was named Publisher in January 2012.  Chatelaine released a new logo and a new brand campaign.

In the second half of 2012, Chatelaine was No. 1 for the first time in the magazine's history in paid circulation, and single copy sales were up 8%.

In the past, the magazine has named a Woman of the Year, honouring a Canadian woman for her achievements in the previous year. Honorees have included Prime Minister Kim Campbell, athlete Chantal Petitclerc, pop singer k.d. lang, and "Jane Doe", a Toronto woman who waged a successful court battle against the Toronto Police Service after alleging that in 1986 the police force had failed to issue warnings about Paul Callow, who subsequently raped her.

In 2013, Francisco and Tucker launched several multichannel initiatives including a two-hour weekly radio program, television edition and various licensing agreements – even a highly successful fitness app which reached #1 in 18 countries in health & fitness category. Chatelaine launched the Chatelaine Show 14 August 2012 on CityLine on CityTV. The Chatelaine Edition became a regular feature on CityTV in 2013.

In July 2013, Rogers Media launched Chatelaine Radio, a two-hour weekly lifestyle radio program. The program, hosted by a local personality in each market but with common health, food and fashion features contributed by the magazine's editors, initially premiered on four Rogers Radio stations, CHFI-FM in Toronto, CHFM-FM in Calgary and CHYM-FM and CIKZ-FM in Kitchener-Waterloo.

Francisco left to run Good Housekeeping in the US in 2013. Karine Ewart was named editor in chief January 2014.

2015–2018

Lianne George was named editor in chief in June 2015. George had been the magazine's editorial director since 2014. By 2017 circulation had fallen from the largest in Canada the fourth largest. In 2017, Rogers Media reduced the number of print editions from twelve times a year to six.

2019-present

Maureen Halushak was named editor in January 2019.

On 20 March 2019, Rogers announced a deal to sell the magazine to St. Joseph Communications.

See also
 Media in Canada
 Miss Chatelaine

References

External links
 Chatelaine magazine website (English)

1928 establishments in Ontario
Women's magazines published in Canada
Monthly magazines published in Canada
Magazines established in 1928
Magazines published in Toronto
St. Joseph Media magazines